Olive Joan Boulind CBE (née Siddall; 24 September 1912 – 29 July 2004) was an academic, fellow and tutor at Hughes Hall, Cambridge.  She was appointed a CBE in 1975.  She was married to Henry Frederick Boulind (1906–1970) and mother of Richard Henry Boulind (1938–1987), Gillian Joan Boulind (1941–1973) and Peter Rodney Boulind (1943–) ; 4 members of the family are buried together in the Parish of the Ascension Burial Ground in Cambridge.

External links

References

 ‘BOULIND, Mrs (Olive) Joan’, Who Was Who, A & C Black, an imprint of Bloomsbury Publishing plc, 1920–2008; online edn, Oxford University Press, Dec 2012 ; online edn, Nov 2012 accessed 12 March 2013

1912 births
2004 deaths
Fellows of Hughes Hall, Cambridge
Commanders of the Order of the British Empire
Presidents of the National Council of Women of Great Britain